Yordanka Blagoeva (born 19 January 1947) is a former Bulgarian high jumper. She competed at the 1968, 1972, 1976 and 1980 Olympics and finished in 17th, 2nd (silver medal), 3rd (bronze medal) and 16th place, respectively. She won the high jump at the 1965 Summer Universiade and 1973 European Athletics Indoor Championships. On 24 September 1972 she became the first Bulgarian athlete to break a world record. Next year she also set a new indoor high jump record, and was ranked as the best high jumper in Europe.

In 1972 Blagova graduated from a Sports Academy. She later served as president of Bulgarian aerobics federation.

She is considered to be one of Bulgaria's top athletes. In 2017, when she was aged 70, the documentary film Beyond the Jump was made to cover her life and career.

References

1947 births
Bulgarian female high jumpers
People from Montana, Bulgaria
Olympic bronze medalists for Bulgaria
Olympic silver medalists for Bulgaria
Athletes (track and field) at the 1968 Summer Olympics
Athletes (track and field) at the 1972 Summer Olympics
Athletes (track and field) at the 1976 Summer Olympics
Athletes (track and field) at the 1980 Summer Olympics
Olympic athletes of Bulgaria
World record setters in athletics (track and field)
Living people
Medalists at the 1976 Summer Olympics
Medalists at the 1972 Summer Olympics
Olympic silver medalists in athletics (track and field)
Olympic bronze medalists in athletics (track and field)
Universiade medalists in athletics (track and field)
People from Montana Province
Universiade gold medalists for Bulgaria
Medalists at the 1965 Summer Universiade